Doab Rural District is in Doab Samsami District of Kuhrang County, Chaharmahal and Bakhtiari province, Iran. At the census of 2006, its population was 5,744 in 1,018 households; there were 3,558 inhabitants in 797 households at the following census of 2011; and in the most recent census of 2016, the population of the rural district was 3,353 in 1,131 households. The largest of its 33 villages was Afsarabad, with 329 people.

References 

Kuhrang County

Rural Districts of Chaharmahal and Bakhtiari Province

Populated places in Chaharmahal and Bakhtiari Province

Populated places in Kuhrang County